The Ellis wormhole is the special case of the Ellis drainhole in which the 'ether' is not flowing and there is no gravity.  What remains is a pure traversable wormhole comprising a pair of identical twin, nonflat, three-dimensional regions joined at a two-sphere, the 'throat' of the wormhole.  As seen in the image shown, two-dimensional equatorial cross sections of the wormhole are catenoidal 'collars' that are asymptotically flat far from the throat.  There being no gravity in force, an inertial observer (test particle) can sit forever at rest at any point in space, but if set in motion by some disturbance will follow a geodesic of an equatorial cross section at constant speed, as would also a photon.  This phenomenon shows that in space-time the curvature of space has nothing to do with gravity (the 'curvature of time’, one could say).

As a special case of the Ellis drainhole, itself a 'traversable wormhole', the Ellis wormhole dates back to the drainhole's discovery in 1969 (date of first submission) by H. G. Ellis,
and independently at about the same time by K. A. Bronnikov.

Ellis and Bronnikov derived the original traversable wormhole as a solution of the Einstein vacuum field equations augmented by inclusion of a scalar field  minimally coupled to the geometry of space-time with coupling polarity opposite to the orthodox polarity (negative instead of positive). Some years later M. S. Morris and K. S. Thorne manufactured a duplicate of the Ellis wormhole to use as a tool for teaching general relativity,
asserting that existence of such a wormhole required the presence of 'negative energy', a viewpoint Ellis had considered and explicitly refused to accept, on the grounds that arguments for it were unpersuasive.

The wormhole solution

The wormhole metric has the proper-time form

where

If one goes further and sets  to 0, the metric becomes that of Minkowski space-time, the flat space-time of the special theory of relativity.

Every test particle or photon is seen to follow such an equatorial geodesic at a fixed coordinate speed, which could be 0, there being no gravitational field built into Minkowski space-time.  These properties of Minkowski space-time all have their counterparts in the Ellis wormhole, modified, however, by the fact that the metric and therefore the geodesics of equatorial cross sections of the wormhole are not straight lines, rather are the 'straightest possible' paths in the cross sections. It is of interest, therefore, to see what these equatorial geodesics look like.

Equatorial geodesics of the wormhole

In cylindrical coordinates  the equation  has  as its graph.

After some integrations and substitutions the equations for a geodesic of  parametrized by  reduce to

and

where  is a constant. Thus every 'circle of latitude' ( constant) is a geodesic. If on the other hand  is not identically 0, then its zeroes are isolated and the reduced equations can be combined to yield the orbital equation

There are three cases to be considered:
  which entails that  so that the geodesic does not cross the throat at  but spirals onto it from one side or the other;
  which allows the geodesic to traverse the wormhole from either side to the other.
The figures exhibit examples of the three types.

That these geodesics can bend around the wormhole makes clear that the curvature of space alone, without the aid of gravity, can cause test particles and photons to follow paths that deviate significantly from straight lines and can create lensing effects.

Dynamic Ellis wormhole

There is a dynamic version of the Ellis wormhole that is a solution of the same field equations 
that the static Ellis wormhole is a solution of.
Its metric is

where

 being a positive constant.  There is a 'point singularity' at  but everywhere else the metric is regular and curvatures are finite.  Geodesics that do 
not encounter the point singularity are complete; those that do can be extended beyond it by proceeding along any of the geodesics that encounter the singularity from the opposite time direction and have compatible tangents (similarly to geodesics of the graph of  that encounter the singularity at the origin).

For a fixed nonzero value of  the equatorial cross section on which  has the metric

For  the metric of the  equatorial cross section is

which describes a 'hypercone' with its vertex at the singular point, its latitude circles of geodesic radius  having circumferences   Unlike the catenoid, neither the hypercatenoid nor the hypercone is fully representable as a surface in euclidean three-space; only the portions where  (thus where  or equivalently ) can be 
embedded in that way.

Examination of the curvature tensor reveals that the full dynamic Ellis wormhole space-time manifold is asymptotically flat in all directions  timelike, lightlike, and spacelike.

Applications

 Scattering by an Ellis wormhole
 Spatial lensing (not gravitational lensing, as there is no gravity) in the Ellis wormhole
Microlensing by the Ellis wormhole
Wave effect in lensing by the Ellis wormhole
Image centroid displacements due to microlensing by the Ellis wormhole
Exact lens equation for the Ellis wormhole
Lensing by wormholes

References

Wormhole theory
Exact solutions in general relativity